The John Deere Model G tractor was a large three-plow row-crop tractor produced by John Deere from 1937 to 1953, with successor models produced until 1961.It was followed by the updated 70, 720 and 730 models.

Description and production
The G was first produced in 1937. It was a general-purpose row-crop tractor, with sufficient pulling power to manage three plows. As with most row-crop tractors, the spacing between the rear wheels could be adjusted to suit row spacings. On later models the front wheels were offered with wide and narrow wheel arrangements. The tractor was equipped with a two-cylinder side-by-side  engine, of  displacement. Both gasoline and kerosene-fueled versions were available. About 64,000 Model Gs were built at the John Deere factory in Waterloo, Iowa. Sale price was about $2,600.

The G was originally to be the Model F, since A, B, C (the GP), D and E (for stationary engines) had all been used, but Deere wished to avoid confusion with the Farmall F-20 and moved to G, retaining the F-prefix for part numbers.

Early Gs tended to overheat, so a larger radiator was substituted. The G received Henry Dreyfuss styling in 1942 and was designated the GM, as it was considered modernized. The plain G designation was reinstated in 1947, and GN (single front wheel) and GW (wide front wheels) models were produced.

John Deere 70
From 1953 the G was replaced by the John Deere 70. with updated styling. The 70 could be ordered for gasoline, distillate, LP gas and diesel fuels. Engine power was increased, and the 70 could pull four or five plows. The gasoline starting engine  for the diesel engines was updated from a two-cylinder side-by-side to a V-4. The diesel was found to be particularly powerful, and sold well. About 43,000 70s were built at Waterloo, at a sales price of about $2,800.

≥≥The 720  was===John Deere 720===

From 1956 the 70 was replaced by the John Deere 720. with new styling. The 720 was the largest two-cylinder tractor to be offered by Deere and the most powerful row-crop tractor of the time. The 720's gasoline engine developed .

John Deere 730
In 1958 the John Deere 730 was introduced. It maintained the same powertrain as the 720. An electric start in lieu of the gasoline starting engine was offered for diesel models. Production in the United States ran through 1961, when the tooling was relocated to a plant in Rosario, Argentina, where production continued until 1968.

720s and 730s were produced at the Waterloo plant. 22,925 were manufactured, at a sales price of about $3,700.

References

External links
 Test 295: John Deere G at the Nebraska Tractor Test Laboratory (NTTL)
 Test 383: John Deere G at the NTTL
 Test 514: John Deere 70 LPG at the NTTL
 Test 506: John Deere 70 All-Fuel at the NTTL
 Test 528: John Deere 70 Diesel at the NTTL
 Test 604: John Deere 620/630 All-Fuel at the NTTL
 Test 605: John Deere 720/730 at the NTTL
 Test 606: John Deere 720/730 All-Fuel at the NTTL

John Deere tractors